The third season of The Great Australian Bake Off premiered on 11 October 2016.

The Bakers
The following is the list of the bakers that are competing this season:
{| class="wikitable" style="text-align:center"
|-
! style="background:skyblue" "color:black;"| Baker
! style="background:skyblue" "color:black;"| Age 
! style="background:skyblue" "color:black;"| Occupation 
! style="background:skyblue" "color:black;"| Hometown
! style="background:skyblue" "color:black;"| Competition Status
|-
| Olivia McMahon
| 37
| Fine Dining Waitress
| Brisbane, Queensland
| style="background:gold"| Season Winner
|-
| Monica Cavallaro
| 43
| Retail Manager 
| Sydney, New South Wales
| style="background:limegreen"| Season Runner-Up
|-
| Antonio Marcora
| 16 
| School Student
| Sydney, New South Wales
| style="background:limegreen"| Season Runner-Up
|-
| Liesel Morgan
| 20
| University Student
| Perth, Western Australia
| style="background:tomato"| Eliminated (Episode 9)
|-
| Fiona Nguyen
| 32
| Patent & Trademark Lawyer
| Brisbane, Queensland
| style="background:tomato"| Eliminated (Episode 8)
|-
| James Rudd
| 26
| IT Technical Support
| Perth, Western Australia
| style="background:tomato"| Eliminated (Episode 7)
|-
| Noel Button
| 59
| Retired Teacher
| Launceston, Tasmania
| style="background:tomato"| Eliminated (Episode 6)
|-
| Jeremy Allan
| 30 
| Welding & Vessel Inspector
| Adelaide, South Australia
| style="background:tomato"| Eliminated (Episode 5)
|-
| Bojan Petrovic
| 37
| Tow Truck Business Owner
| Canberra, Australian Capital Territory
| style="background:tomato"| Eliminated (Episode 4)
|-
| Diana Gyllen 
| 29
| Model
| Sydney, New South Wales
| style="background:tomato"| Eliminated (Episode 3)
|-
| Cheryl Roberts
| 59
| Horse Trainer
| Berry, New South Wales
| style="background:tomato"| Eliminated (Episode 2)
|-
| Janette Betts
| 62
| Palliative Care Nurse
| Melbourne, Victoria
| style="background:tomato"| Eliminated (Episode 1)
|}

Results Summary

Colour key:

Episodes

Episode 1: Cakes

Episode 2: Biscuits

Episode 3: Pies & Tarts

Episode 4: Chocolate

Episode 5: Bread

Episode 6: Retro

Episode 7: Pastry

Episode 8: Sweet Dough

Episode 9: International

Episode 10: Final

Ratings

References

2016 Australian television seasons
3